Rainier is a cultivar of cherry. It was developed in 1952 at Washington State University by Harold Fogle, and named after Mount Rainier. It is a cross between the 'Bing' and 'Van' cultivars.

'Rainiers' are considered a premium type of cherry. They are sweet with a thin skin and thick creamy-yellow flesh. The cherries are susceptible to temperature, wind, and rain, and the flesh is generally more watery than other sweet cherries. Birds eat about 1/3 of a 'Rainier' cherry orchard's crop.

Plant facts
The standard rootstock for the 'Rainier' cherry is the Mazzard cherry, a wild or seedling sweet cherry used as grafting stock. Mature 'Rainiers' reach a height of 30 to 35 feet and are widely adaptable to various soil types.  Trees should be well spaced to provide maximum sun exposure for individual branches, ensuring fully developed, sweet, ripe fruit at harvest time. 'Rainiers' will produce fruit in 3 to 5 years, with a bloom period in early April. The creamy light yellow to medium yellow-orange fruit develops a red blush and is ready to harvest from late June through early July. 'Rainier' cultivars require pollination. Typical pollenizers are the 'Bing', 'Van', 'Lapins', 'Black Tartarian' and 'Lambert' cultivars. 'Rainiers' grow best in USDA Zones 4–9. It is one of the most cold-hardy sweet cherries.

Notes

References
 Chou, Hsiao-Ching. "Rainier cherries are the peak of the crop" Seattle Post-Intelligencer, 23 June 2001. retrieved 26 June 2006.
 Moore, Elizabeth Armstrong. "If it's July, it must be time for those golden Rainier cherries", The Christian Science Monitor, 6 July 2005, retrieved 6 August 2006.
 

Cherry cultivars